78th meridian may refer to:

78th meridian east, a line of longitude east of the Greenwich Meridian
78th meridian west, a line of longitude west of the Greenwich Meridian